The National Works on Paper Award is a catch-all term for a body of related awards for contemporary art made on, or with, paper. First awarded in 1998, it is the successor event to the Spring Festival of Drawing and the Prints Acquisitive. The award is made biennially, except during the years 1998 to 2000, and 2002 to 2004, when it was made annually. The award and its concomitant exhibition are hosted by the Mornington Peninsula Regional Gallery, located in Mornington, Australia.

In 2008, the total prize pool of the National Works on Paper award was worth A$45,000 and had three components:
The John Tallis Acquisitive Award, valued at A$15,000;
The Mornington Peninsula Regional Shire Acquisition Fund awards, valued at up to A$20,000; and
The Friends of the Mornington Peninsula Regional Gallery Acquisition Fund awards, valued at up to A$10,000.

Winners (major award only)
1998 - Christopher Hodges
1999 - Jennifer Buntine
2000 - Matthew Butterworth
2002 - eX de Medici
2003 - Lisa Roet
2004 - Paul Boston
2006 - Gareth Sansom
2008 - Danie Mellor
2010 - Richard Lewer
2014 - Jess Johnson

References

External links
 Mornington Peninsula Regional Gallery website
 Mornington Peninsula Regional Gallery - 2008 NWOP Award
 MPRG - NWOP Past Exhibitions

Australian art awards
Mornington Peninsula
Awards established in 1998
1998 establishments in Australia